Creamery Falls is a waterfall located on Otsquago Creek north of Van Hornesville, New York in Herkimer County.

References

Waterfalls of New York (state)
Landforms of Herkimer County, New York
Tourist attractions in Herkimer County, New York